The Municipality of Choix is a municipality in Sinaloa in northwestern Mexico. Its seat is Choix.

Political subdivision 
Choix Municipality is subdivided in 8 sindicaturas:
Aguacaliente Grande
Baca
Bacayopa
Baymena
Los Pozos
Picachos
San Javier
Yecorato

References

Municipalities of Sinaloa